1890 in philosophy

Events

Publications 
 William Morris, News from Nowhere
 William James, The Principles of Psychology
 Alfred Marshall, Principles of Economics
 James George Frazer, The Golden Bough

Births 
 August 20 - H. P. Lovecraft (died 1937)

Deaths 
 March 26 - African Spir (born 1837)

References 

Philosophy
19th-century philosophy
Philosophy by year